George William Featherstonhaugh Jr. (1814 – June 10, 1900) was an American businessman and territorial legislator.

Born in Albany, New York, his father was the British-American geologist George William Featherstonhaugh. He settled in Calumet County, Wisconsin Territory and operated a flour mill and a store in Brothertown, Wisconsin. Featherstonehaugh served in the second Wisconsin Constitutional Convention of 1847–1848 and the Wisconsin Territorial Legislature in the Wisconsin Territorial House of Representatives from 1846 to 1848. He then lived in Milwaukee, Wisconsin and died in Gurnee, Illinois.

Notes

1814 births
1900 deaths
Politicians from Albany, New York
People from Brothertown, Wisconsin
Businesspeople from Wisconsin
Members of the Wisconsin Territorial Legislature
19th-century American politicians
Businesspeople from Albany, New York
Duane family
19th-century American businesspeople